Khizer Ahmed  (born 18 November 1991) is a Norwegian cricketer who plays for the national team. In May 2019, he was named in Norway's squad for the Regional Finals of the 2018–19 ICC T20 World Cup Europe Qualifier tournament in Guernsey. He made his Twenty20 International (T20I) debut for Norway against Italy on 15 June 2019.

References

External links
 

1991 births
Living people
Norwegian cricketers
Norway Twenty20 International cricketers
Cricketers from Karachi
Pakistani emigrants to Norway